Ludovika Antje Margareta Jakobsson-Eilers (née Eilers, 25 July 1884 – 1 November 1968) was a German-Finnish figure skater. Competing in pair skating with her husband Walter Jakobsson, she won the gold medal at the 1920 Summer Olympics, where she was the only German-born athlete, and became the oldest female figure skating Olympic champion. The pair also earned three world titles, in 1911, 1914 and 1923, and finished second and fifth at the 1924 and 1928 Olympics, respectively. Eilers also had some success in single skating, winning a bronze medal at the 1911 World Championships.

Early years
Eilers met Jakobsson in 1907 while he was studying engineering in Berlin. They began competing together in 1910 and married in 1911; hence the International Skating Union counts their 1910–1911 medals as half-German, half-Finnish, and those after 1911 as Finnish. The couple lived in Berlin until 1916, when they moved to Helsinki. There Walter got a job of technical director with Konecranes, a leading manufacturer of cranes, while Ludovika starred in a few Finnish silent films.

Results in ladies' singles

Results in pairs with Walter Jakobsson

References

1884 births
1968 deaths
Finnish pair skaters
German female pair skaters
German female single skaters
Olympic figure skaters of Finland
Figure skaters at the 1920 Summer Olympics
Figure skaters at the 1924 Winter Olympics
Figure skaters at the 1928 Winter Olympics
Olympic gold medalists for Finland
Olympic silver medalists for Finland
Sportspeople from Potsdam
Olympic medalists in figure skating
World Figure Skating Championships medalists
Medalists at the 1924 Winter Olympics
Medalists at the 1920 Summer Olympics
Finnish people of German descent
German emigrants to Finland
Naturalized citizens of Finland